Physa aridi is a fossil species of air-breathing freshwater snail, an extinct aquatic pulmonate gastropod mollusk in the family Physidae.  This species has a small, left-handed (or sinistral) shell, as is always the case in this family.  Physa aridi dates from the Senonian (Upper Cretaceous) of the Bauru Group, in São Paulo state, Brazil.

References

Physidae
Cretaceous gastropods
Cretaceous animals of South America
Cretaceous Brazil
Fossils of Brazil
Fossil taxa described in 1974